The Khastakh or Tuora-Yuryakh (Xaastaax) is a river in the Sakha Republic (Yakutia), Russia. It is one of the two tributaries giving origin to the Indigirka. The upper stretch of its course is also known as Khalkan.

The river flows south of the Arctic Circle, across desolate tundra territories of the Oymyakonsky District marked by mountainous terrain and permafrost.

Course
The Khastakh is a left tributary of the Indigirka. It has its sources in the southern slopes of the Khalkan Range (Халканский хребет), a subrange of the Suntar-Khayata, by the border with Okhotsky District of Khabarovsk Krai. The river flows roughly in a northern direction into a basin of the Yana-Oymyakon Highlands filled with lakes where it meanders and divides into multiple channels. Finally the river joins the Taryn-Yuryakh flowing from the right to form the head of the Indigirka  from its mouth.

Tributaries  
The river is frozen between the beginning of October and the end of May.

See also
List of rivers of Russia

References

External links 
Fishing & Tourism in Yakutia
Река Индигирка – поток среди вечной мерзлоты

Tributaries of the Indigirka
Rivers of the Sakha Republic
Suntar-Khayata